Tunberg is a surname. Notable people with the surname include:

 Karl Tunberg (1907−1992), American screenwriter and film producer
 Terence Tunberg, American classical philologist
 William Tunberg (disambiguation), several people

See also
Thunberg

Swedish-language surnames